Walter Nathan (born 3 April 1962) is a Peruvian former international table tennis player.

Nathan was a singles bronze medalist at the 1983 Pan American Games. He represented Peru at the 1992 Summer Olympics in Barcelona, where he partnered his brother Yair in the doubles event.

External links

References

1962 births
Living people
Summer Olympics competitors for Peru
Table tennis players at the 1992 Summer Olympics
Pan American Games medalists in table tennis
Pan American Games bronze medalists for Peru
Table tennis players at the 1983 Pan American Games
Table tennis players at the 1991 Pan American Games
Peruvian male table tennis players
Medalists at the 1983 Pan American Games
Medalists at the 1991 Pan American Games
20th-century Peruvian people
21st-century Peruvian people